Dingxi North railway station is a railway station of Baoji–Lanzhou High-Speed Railway, in Dingxi, Gansu, China. This station opened on 9 July 2017.

Station layout

References 

Railway stations in Gansu
Buildings and structures in Dingxi
Stations on the Xuzhou–Lanzhou High-Speed Railway
Railway stations in China opened in 2017